Grigory Martirosyan (born 14 November 1978) is a politician who served as the State Minister of the de facto independent Republic of Artsakh from 2018 until 2021. He also previously served as Finance Minister from September 2017 until June 2018, when then State Minister, Arayik Harutyunyan, resigned and Martirosyan was appointed in his place.

Biography
Martirosyan was born on November 14, 1978, in Stepanakert, the capital of the Republic of Artsakh. In 1999, he graduated from Artsakh State University with a B.A. in economics. In 2001 he graduated from Yerevan State University with an M.A. in economics. From 1998 to 1999 he was an economist in the State Department of Statistics. From 2000 to 2005 he was a specialist in the State Procurement Agency. From 2005 until 2007 he was the Chief Specialist in the Ministry of Finance and economy. In 2008 he was made Deputy Minister of Finance and in 2015 he was made First Deputy Minister of Finance. On September 25, 2017, he was appointed Minister of Finance by President Bako Sahakyan. On June 8, 2018, he was made Minister of State.

References

1978 births
Living people
People from the Republic of Artsakh
Artsakh University alumni
Yerevan State University alumni